This article contains a list of permanent Ambisonic playback systems and/or production facilities.

Playback systems